José Bolívar (born 17 January 2000) is a Peruvian football player who plays as left back for Universitario de Deportes in Peruvian Primera División.

References

2000 births
Living people
Peruvian footballers
Peruvian Primera División players
Club Deportivo Universidad de San Martín de Porres players
Peru youth international footballers
Association football defenders
Association football wingers